Erin Rachael Doherty (born 16 July 1992) is a British actress. She played the young Princess Anne in the third and fourth seasons of the Netflix drama The Crown, and Becky in the BBC/Amazon Prime drama Chloe (2022).

Early life and education
Doherty is of Irish heritage and from West Green, West Sussex. Doherty's parents divorced when she was 4 and began acting in Sunday drama classes with her older sister Grace shortly after. She studied at Hazelwick School in Crawley, where she grew up. A talented footballer, Doherty played in midfield for and captained the Crawley Wasps and was scouted by Chelsea Women; she reached the age where she “had to commit” to either football or acting and chose the latter.

Doherty took a one-year course at the Guildford School of Acting (2011–12) before training at the Bristol Old Vic Theatre School (2012–15).

Whilst training, Doherty won the Stephen Sondheim Society Student Performer of the Year Award (SSSSPOTY) in 2015 for her rendition of "Broadway Baby" from the Sondheim musical Follies.

Theatre
Doherty is a frequent theatre actress. Since graduating from Bristol Old Vic Theatre School in 2015, she has appeared in a number of productions at some of London's leading theatres. Doherty's performances have consistently attracted positive reviews from leading theatre critics. Michael Billington named Doherty as 'one of the year's greatest discoveries' after her performance in My Name Is Rachel Corrie, a one-woman play about the activist Rachel Corrie. Doherty starred in Jack Thorne's play Junkyard, which led What's On Stage reviewer Kris Hallett to write "Doherty is the star here, and by rights will soon be a star full-stop". Her leading performance in Alan Ayckbourn's play The Divide at the Old Vic Theatre was described by Dominic Cavendish for The Daily Telegraph as having "star-wattage as bright as anything".

Career
Doherty's first television appearance was in a 2016 episode of Call the Midwife, followed by a role in the 2018 BBC miniseries Les Misérables.

In 2018, Doherty was a Screen International Star of Tomorrow, and an Evening Standard Rising Star.

In 2019, Doherty appeared as Princess Anne in the third season of The Crown. She knew little about the princess before being cast, and consequently spent hours studying Anne's family history and life. Doherty made a point of only watching footage of the princess at the age she was portraying her, rather than interviews of Anne in later life. Anne's voice is very different from Doherty's, being much lower in pitch; the actress spent time carefully learning and mimicking it, finding that it "was the key into her psyche". Doherty reprised her role as Princess Anne in the fourth season of the series.

In 2022, Doherty is the protagonist in the BBC/Amazon Prime drama Chloe alongside Poppy Gilbert as Becky. She was also cast to portray Anne Askew in the psychological horror film Firebrand.

Personal life
Doherty is in a relationship with fellow actress Sophie Melville.

Filmography

Awards and nominations

References

External links

 CVGG Profile Erin Doherty

Living people
1992 births
English people of Irish descent
British television actresses
People educated at Hazelwick School
Alumni of Bristol Old Vic Theatre School
Alumni of the Guildford School of Acting
Actresses from Sussex
English film actresses
English lesbian actresses
People from Crawley
British people of Irish descent
English LGBT actors
20th-century LGBT people
21st-century English LGBT people